Milo or Milon of Croton (late 6th century BC) was a famous ancient Greek athlete.

He was most likely a historical person, as he is mentioned by many classical authors, among them Aristotle, Pausanias, Cicero, Herodotus, Vitruvius, Epictetus, and the author of the Suda, but there are many legendary stories surrounding him. 

He was born in the Greek colony of Croton in Southern Italy. He was a six time Olympic victor; once for Boys Wrestling  in 540 BC at the 60th Olympics, and five time wrestling champion at the 62nd through 66th Olympiads.  Milo kept on competing, even well after what would have been considered a normal Olympic Athlete's prime:  by the 67th Olympiad, he would have been over 40 years of age.  He also attended many of the Pythian Games.

Diodorus Siculus wrote in his history that Milo was a follower of Pythagoras and also that he commanded the Crotonian army which defeated the Sybarites in 511 BC, while wearing his Olympic wreaths and dressed like Hercules in a lion's skin and carrying a club.

Feats of strength
Ancient sources and legends report that he took great pleasure in showing off his strength.  He had a number of feats he would perform, such as these:
 He would hold his arm out, with fingers outstretched, and challenge people to attempt to bend his little finger.
 He would stand on a greased iron disk and challenge people to push him off of it.
 He would hold a pomegranate in one hand, and challenge others to take it from him.  Nobody ever could, and despite his holding the fruit very tightly, it was never damaged.
 He would train in the off years by carrying a newborn calf on his back every day until the Olympics took place. By the time the events were to take place, he was carrying a four-year-old cow on his back. He carried the full-grown cow the length of the stadium, then proceeded to kill, roast, and eat it.

Death
Legend has it that such feats were his eventual undoing.  His final test of strength came when he was traveling the countryside and met a villager trying to split a stump with hammer and wedges.  Milo excitedly asked the man if he could attempt to split the wood with his strength, not using any tools at all.  The villager, honored by Milo's offer, went off to fetch food while Milo worked.  Milo immediately tried to pull the stump apart by inserting his fingers in the crack where the villager had driven the wedges.  As he pulled the stump open, the wedges fell out, trapping Milo's fingers.  Without the wedges there to hold the crack open, when Milo tried, he could not free his fingers from the stump.  There he waited for the villager to return with food.  Legend then says that Milo met his end when wolves, or a lion, took advantage of his predicament and descended upon him.

Statue

Bibliography

References

External links

 Web Gallery of Art Depictions of Milo of Croton by Vittoria, Puget, Falconet, and Suvée

6th-century BC Greek people
Ancient Olympic competitors
Ancient Crotonian athletes
Ancient Greek wrestlers
Ancient Pythian athletes
Pythagoreans of Magna Graecia
Year of birth unknown
Year of death unknown